Mt. Rush is an unincorporated community in Buckingham County, Virginia, United States. It is located at the east endpoint of State Route 24 at Highway 60. The geographic center of Virginia is just a few miles south of the community.

References 

VA HomeTownLocator

Unincorporated communities in Buckingham County, Virginia
Unincorporated communities in Virginia